The Datuk Patinggi Haji Abdul Rahman Bridge, also known as the Jambatan Datuk Patinggi Haji Abdul Rahman, and New Satok Bridge, is a major bridge crossing Sarawak River in Kuching city, Sarawak, Malaysia. Located near the bridge is the site of the former Satok Bridge.

The bridge was named after Datuk Patinggi Haji Abdul Rahman Ya'kub, the former Chief Minister of Sarawak and Yang di-Pertua Negeri of Sarawak.

Bridges in Sarawak
Buildings and structures in Kuching
Box girder bridges
1975 establishments in Malaysia